The Green Socialist Party is a minor political party of the Dominican Republic. In the 16 May 2006 election, the party was a member of the defeated Grand National Alliance.

References

External links
Official party site

Democratic socialist parties in North America
Ecosocialist parties
Global Greens member parties
Green parties in North America
Political parties in the Dominican Republic
Political parties with year of establishment missing
Socialism in the Dominican Republic